Hermanos Ameijeiras Airport  is a regional airport that serves the city of Las Tunas in Cuba. It is located into its north-eastern suburb.

References

Airports in Cuba
Las Tunas (city)
Buildings and structures in Las Tunas Province